This is a list of museums in Baku, the capital city of Azerbaijan.

List

References 

Museums in Baku
Baku
Baku